Random number generation is a process by which, often by means of a random number generator (RNG), a sequence of numbers or symbols that cannot be reasonably predicted better than by random chance is generated. This means that the particular outcome sequence will contain some patterns detectable in hindsight but unpredictable to foresight. True random number generators can be hardware random-number generators (HRNGS) that generate random numbers, wherein each generation is a function of the current value of a physical environment's attribute that is constantly changing in a manner that is practically impossible to model. This would be in contrast to so-called "random number generations" done by pseudorandom number generators (PRNGs) that generate numbers that only look random but are in fact pre-determined—these generations can be reproduced simply by knowing the state of the PRNG.

Various applications of randomness have led to the development of several different methods for generating random data. Some of these have existed since ancient times, among whose ranks are well-known "classic" examples, including the rolling of dice, coin flipping, the shuffling of playing cards, the use of yarrow stalks (for divination) in the I Ching, as well as countless other techniques. Because of the mechanical nature of these techniques, generating large quantities of sufficiently random numbers (important in statistics) required much work and time. Thus, results would sometimes be collected and distributed as random number tables.

Several computational methods for pseudorandom number generation exist. All fall short of the goal of true randomness, although they may meet, with varying success, some of the statistical tests for randomness intended to measure how unpredictable their results are (that is, to what degree their patterns are discernible). This generally makes them unusable for applications such as cryptography. However, carefully designed cryptographically secure pseudorandom number generators (CSPRNGS) also exist, with special features specifically designed for use in cryptography.

Practical applications and uses 

Random number generators have applications in gambling, statistical sampling, computer simulation, cryptography, completely randomized design, and other areas where producing an unpredictable result is desirable.  Generally, in applications having unpredictability as the paramount feature, such as in security applications, hardware generators are generally preferred over pseudorandom algorithms, where feasible.

Pseudorandom number generators are very useful in developing  Monte Carlo-method simulations, as debugging is facilitated by the ability to run the same sequence of random numbers again by starting from the same random seed. They are also used in cryptography – so long as the seed is secret. Sender and  receiver can generate the same set of numbers automatically to use as keys.

The generation of pseudorandom numbers is an important and common task in computer programming. While cryptography and certain numerical algorithms require a very high degree of apparent randomness, many other operations only need a modest amount of unpredictability. Some simple examples might be presenting a user with a "random quote of the day", or determining which way a computer-controlled adversary might move in a computer game. Weaker forms of randomness are used in hash algorithms and in creating amortized searching and sorting algorithms.

Some applications which appear at first sight to be suitable for randomization are in fact not quite so simple. For instance, a system that "randomly" selects music tracks for a background music system must only appear random, and may even have ways to control the selection of music: a true random system would have no restriction on the same item appearing two or three times in succession.

"True" vs. pseudo-random numbers 

There are two principal methods used to generate random numbers. The first method measures some physical phenomenon that is expected to be random and then compensates for possible biases in the measurement process. Example sources include measuring atmospheric noise, thermal noise, and other external electromagnetic and quantum phenomena. For example, cosmic background radiation or radioactive decay as measured over short timescales represent sources of natural entropy (as a measure of unpredictability or surprise of the number generation process).

The speed at which entropy can be obtained from natural sources is dependent on the underlying physical phenomena being measured. Thus, sources of naturally occurring "true" entropy are said to be blocking they are rate-limited until enough entropy is harvested to meet the demand. On some Unix-like systems, including most Linux distributions, the pseudo device file  will block until sufficient entropy is harvested from the environment.

The second method uses computational algorithms that can produce long sequences of apparently random results, which are in fact completely determined by a shorter initial value, known as a seed value or key. As a result, the entire seemingly random sequence can be reproduced if the seed value is known. This type of random number generator is often called a pseudorandom number generator. This type of generator typically does not rely on sources of naturally occurring entropy, though it may be periodically seeded by natural sources. This generator type is non-blocking, so they are not rate-limited by an external event, making large bulk reads a possibility.

Some systems take a hybrid approach, providing randomness harvested from natural sources when available, and falling back to periodically re-seeded software-based cryptographically secure pseudorandom number generators (CSPRNGs). The fallback occurs when the desired read rate of randomness exceeds the ability of the natural harvesting approach to keep up with the demand. This approach avoids the rate-limited blocking behavior of random number generators based on slower and purely environmental methods.

While a pseudorandom number generator based solely on deterministic logic can never be regarded as a "true" random number source in the purest sense of the word, in practice they are generally sufficient even for demanding security-critical applications. Carefully designed and implemented pseudorandom number generators can be certified for security-critical cryptographic purposes, as is the case with the yarrow algorithm and fortuna. The former is the basis of the  source of entropy on FreeBSD, AIX, OS X, NetBSD, and others. OpenBSD uses a pseudorandom number algorithm known as arc4random.

Generation methods

Physical methods 

The earliest methods for generating random numbers, such as dice, coin flipping and roulette wheels, are still used today, mainly in games and gambling as they tend to be too slow for most applications in statistics and cryptography.

A physical random number generator can be based on an essentially random atomic or subatomic physical phenomenon whose unpredictability can be traced to the laws of quantum mechanics. Sources of entropy include radioactive decay, thermal noise, shot noise, avalanche noise in Zener diodes, clock drift, the timing of actual movements of a hard disk read-write head, and radio noise.  However, physical phenomena and tools used to measure them generally feature asymmetries and systematic biases that make their outcomes not uniformly random.  A randomness extractor, such as a cryptographic hash function, can be used to approach a uniform distribution of bits from a non-uniformly random source, though at a lower bit rate.

The appearance of wideband photonic entropy sources, such as optical chaos and amplified spontaneous emission noise, greatly aid the development of the physical random number generator. Among them, optical chaos has a high potential to physically produce high-speed random numbers due to its high bandwidth and large amplitude. A prototype of a high speed, real-time physical random bit generator based on a chaotic laser was built in 2013.

Various imaginative ways of collecting this entropic information have been devised. One technique is to run a hash function against a frame of a video stream from an unpredictable source. Lavarand used this technique with images of a number of lava lamps. HotBits measures radioactive decay with Geiger–Muller tubes, while Random.org uses variations in the amplitude of atmospheric noise recorded with a normal radio.

Another common entropy source is the behavior of human users of the system. While people are not considered good randomness generators upon request, they generate random behavior quite well in the context of playing mixed strategy games. Some security-related computer software requires the user to make a lengthy series of mouse movements or keyboard inputs to create sufficient entropy needed to generate random keys or to initialize pseudorandom number generators.

Computational methods 

Most computer generated random numbers use PRNGs which are algorithms that can automatically create long runs of numbers with good random properties but eventually the sequence repeats (or the memory usage grows without bound). These random numbers are fine in many situations but are not as random as numbers generated from electromagnetic atmospheric noise used as a source of entropy. The series of values generated by such algorithms is generally determined by a fixed number called a seed. One of the most common PRNG is the linear congruential generator, which uses the recurrence

The maximum number of numbers the formula can produce is the modulus, . The recurrence relation can be extended to matrices to have much longer periods and better statistical properties
.
To avoid certain non-random properties of a single linear congruential generator, several such random number generators with slightly different values of the multiplier coefficient, can be used in parallel, with a "master" random number generator that selects from among the several different generators.

A simple pen-and-paper method for generating random numbers is the so-called middle-square method suggested by John von Neumann. While simple to implement, its output is of poor quality. It has a very short period and severe weaknesses, such as the output sequence almost always converging to zero.  A recent innovation is to combine the middle square with a Weyl sequence. This method produces high quality output through a long period.

Most computer programming languages include functions or library routines that provide random number generators. They are often designed to provide a random byte or word, or a floating point number uniformly distributed between 0 and 1.

The quality i.e. randomness of such library functions varies widely from completely predictable output, to cryptographically secure. The default random number generator in many languages, including Python, Ruby, R, IDL and PHP is based on the Mersenne Twister algorithm and is not sufficient for cryptography purposes, as is explicitly stated in the language documentation. Such library functions often have poor statistical properties and some will repeat patterns after only tens of thousands of trials.  They are often initialized using a computer's real-time clock as the seed, since such a clock is 64 bit and measures in nanoseconds, far beyond the person's precision. These functions may provide enough randomness for certain tasks (for example video games) but are unsuitable where high-quality randomness is required, such as in cryptography applications, statistics or numerical analysis.

Much higher quality random number sources are available on most operating systems;  for example /dev/random on various BSD flavors, Linux, Mac OS X, IRIX, and Solaris, or CryptGenRandom for Microsoft Windows. Most programming languages, including those mentioned above, provide a means to access these higher quality sources.

By humans 
Random number generation may also be performed by humans, in the form of collecting various inputs from end users and using them as a randomization source. However, most studies find that human subjects have some degree of non-randomness when attempting to produce a random sequence of e.g. digits or letters.  They may alternate too much between choices when compared to a good random generator; thus, this approach is not widely used.

Post-processing and statistical checks 

Even given a source of plausible random numbers (perhaps from a quantum mechanically based hardware generator), obtaining numbers which are completely unbiased takes care. In addition, behavior of these generators often changes with temperature, power supply voltage, the age of the device, or other outside interference. And a software bug in a pseudorandom number routine, or a hardware bug in the hardware it runs on, may be similarly difficult to detect.

Generated random numbers are sometimes subjected to statistical tests before use to ensure that the underlying source is still working, and then post-processed to improve their statistical properties. An example would be the TRNG9803 hardware random number generator, which uses an entropy measurement as a hardware test, and then post-processes the random sequence with a shift register stream cipher. It is generally hard to use statistical tests to validate the generated random numbers. Wang and Nicol proposed a distance-based statistical testing technique that is used to identify the weaknesses of several random generators. Li and Wang proposed a method of testing random numbers based on laser chaotic entropy sources using Brownian motion properties.

Other considerations

Reshaping the distribution

Uniform distributions 
Most random number generators natively work with integers or individual bits, so an extra step is required to arrive at the "canonical" uniform distribution between 0 and 1. The implementation is not as trivial as dividing the integer by its maximum possible value. Specifically:
 The integer used in the transformation must provide enough bits for the intended precision.
 The nature of floating-point math itself means there exists more precision the closer the number is to zero. This extra precision is usually not used due to the sheer number of bits required.
 Rounding error in division may bias the result. At worst, a supposedly excluded bound may be drawn contrary to expectations based on real-number math.

The mainstream algorithm, used by OpenJDK, Rust, and NumPy, is described in a proposal for C++'s STL. It does not use the extra precision and suffers from bias only in the last bit due to round-to-even. Other numeric concerns are warranted when shifting this "canonical" uniform distribution to a different range. A proposed method for the Swift programming language claims to use the full precision everywhere.

Uniformly distributed integers are commonly used in algorithms such as the Fisher–Yates shuffle. Again, a naive implementation may induce a modulo bias into the result, so more involved algorithms must be used. A method that nearly never performs division was described in 2018 by Daniel Lemire, with the current state-of-the-art being the arithmetic encoding-inspired 2021 "optimal algorithm" by Stephen Canon of Apple Inc.

Most 0 to 1 RNGs include 0 but exclude 1, while others include or exclude both.

Other distributions 

Given a source of uniform random numbers, there are a couple of methods to create a new random source that corresponds to a probability density function. One method, called the inversion method, involves integrating up to an area greater than or equal to the random number (which should be generated between 0 and 1 for proper distributions). A second method, called the acceptance-rejection method, involves choosing an x and y value and testing whether the function of x is greater than the y value.  If it is, the x value is accepted.  Otherwise, the x value is rejected and the algorithm tries again.

As an example for rejection sampling, to generate a pair of statistically independent standard normally distributed random numbers (x, y), one may first generate the polar coordinates (r, θ), where r2~χ22 and θ~UNIFORM(0,2π) (see Box–Muller transform).

Whitening 

The outputs of multiple independent RNGs can be combined (for example, using a bit-wise XOR operation) to provide a combined RNG at least as good as the best RNG used. This is referred to as software whitening.

Computational and hardware random number generators are sometimes combined to reflect the benefits of both kinds. Computational random number generators can typically generate pseudorandom numbers much faster than physical generators, while physical generators can generate "true randomness."

Low-discrepancy sequences as an alternative 
Some computations making use of a random number generator can be summarized as the computation of a total or average value, such as the computation of integrals by the Monte Carlo method. For such problems, it may be possible to find a more accurate solution by the use of so-called low-discrepancy sequences, also called quasirandom numbers. Such sequences have a definite pattern that fills in gaps evenly, qualitatively speaking; a truly random sequence may, and usually does, leave larger gaps.

Activities and demonstrations 
The following sites make available random number samples:
 The SOCR resource pages contain a number of hands-on interactive activities and demonstrations of random number generation using Java applets.
 The Quantum Optics Group at the ANU generates random numbers sourced from quantum vacuum. Sample of random numbers are available at their quantum random number generator research page.
 Random.org makes available random numbers that are sourced from the randomness of atmospheric noise.
 The Quantum Random Bit Generator Service at the Ruđer Bošković Institute harvests randomness from the quantum process of photonic emission in semiconductors. They supply a variety of ways of fetching the data, including libraries for several programming languages.
 The Group at the Taiyuan University of Technology generates random numbers sourced from a chaotic laser. Samples of random number are available at their Physical Random Number Generator Service.

Backdoors 

Since much cryptography depends on a cryptographically secure random number generator for key and cryptographic nonce generation, if a random number generator can be made predictable, it can be used as backdoor by an attacker to break the encryption.

The NSA is reported to have inserted a backdoor into the NIST certified cryptographically secure pseudorandom number generator Dual EC DRBG. If for example an SSL connection is created using this random number generator, then according to Matthew Green it would allow NSA to determine the state of the random number generator, and thereby eventually be able to read all data sent over the SSL connection. Even though it was apparent that Dual_EC_DRBG was a very poor and possibly backdoored pseudorandom number generator long before the NSA backdoor was confirmed in 2013, it had seen significant usage in practice until 2013, for example by the prominent security company RSA Security. There have subsequently been accusations that RSA Security knowingly inserted a NSA backdoor into its products, possibly as part of the Bullrun program. RSA has denied knowingly inserting a backdoor into its products.

It has also been theorized that hardware RNGs could be secretly modified to have less entropy than stated, which would make encryption using the hardware RNG susceptible to attack. One such method which has been published works by modifying the dopant mask of the chip, which would be undetectable to optical reverse-engineering. For example, for random number generation in Linux, it is seen as unacceptable to use Intel's RDRAND hardware RNG without mixing in the RDRAND output with other sources of entropy to counteract any backdoors in the hardware RNG, especially after the revelation of the NSA Bullrun program.

In 2010, a U.S. lottery draw was rigged by the information security director of the Multi-State Lottery Association (MUSL), who surreptitiously installed backdoor malware on the MUSL's secure RNG computer during routine maintenance. During the hacks the man won a total amount of $16,500,000 by predicting the numbers correctly a few times in year.

Address space layout randomization (ASLR), a mitigation against rowhammer and related attacks on the physical hardware of memory chips has been found to be inadequate as of early 2017 by VUSec. The random number algorithm, if based on a shift register implemented in hardware, is predictable at sufficiently large values of p and can be reverse engineered with enough processing power (Brute Force Hack).
This also indirectly means that malware using this method can run on both GPUs and CPUs if coded to do so, even using GPU to break ASLR on the CPU itself.

See also 

 Flipism
 League of entropy
 List of random number generators
 PP (complexity)
 Procedural generation
 Randomized algorithm
 Random password generator
 Random variable, contains a chance-dependent value

References

Further reading 
 
 
 
 
 
  NIST SP800-90A, B, C series on random number generation

External links 
 RANDOM.ORG True Random Number Service
 Quantum random number generator at ANU
 
 jRand a Java-based framework for the generation of simulation sequences, including pseudorandom sequences of numbers
 Random number generators in NAG Fortran Library
 Randomness Beacon at NIST, broadcasting full-entropy bit-strings in blocks of 512 bits every 60 seconds. Designed to provide unpredictability, autonomy, and consistency.
 A system call for random numbers: getrandom(), a LWN.net article describing a dedicated Linux system call
 Statistical Properties of Pseudo Random Sequences and Experiments with PHP and Debian OpenSSL
 Random Sequence Generator based on Avalanche Noise
 Random lottery numbers generator - ISAAC implemented in PHP 

 
Information theory